Patrick Kraft is an American college athletics administrator. He was named athletic director for Pennsylvania State University in April 2022. Kraft was previously an athletic director for Temple University, and Boston College.

Early life and education
Patrick Kraft was born in Libertyville, Illinois. Kraft attended Indiana University and walked on the football team, eventually earning a scholarship.  At Indiana, Kraft received three degrees, including his PhD in Sports Management. Later in his athletic director career, Kraft became an assistant athletics director for Indiana.

Athletic director

Temple
After serving for two years as the deputy athletic director for Temple University, Kraft became the athletic director in 2015. With the help of football coach Matt Rhule, Temple enjoyed great athletic success during his tenure.

Boston College
Following six years as athletic director, Kraft became the athletic director for Boston College in 2020. Boston College won its first women's national championship, winning the women's lacrosse championship.

References

Year of birth missing (living people)
Living people
Indiana University alumni
Boston College Eagles athletic directors
People from Libertyville, Illinois
Temple Owls athletic directors